is the 7th single released by Greeeen on May 28, 2008.

It reached the number-one position on the Japanese Oricon weekly charts for 2 weeks and physically sold over 500,000 copies. The song was ranked at the number-one position on the Billboard Japan Hot 100 Singles Yearly Charts of 2008. On May 28, 2009, it was announced that the sales of the full-track ringtone digital-format version (Chaku Uta Full) of the song passed 2.3 million copies, surpassing the Japanese digital sales record of Thelma Aoyama's single "Soba ni Iru ne". The song was given the certificate for the "best selling download single in Japan" by the Guinness World Records on June 29, 2009.

Track list
 Kiseki (キセキ; Miracle)
 Rookies (ルーキーズ) – a manga written by Masanori Morita which also turned into a Japanese television drama with "Kiseki" as their main song.

Covers
The song also was covered by Andrew W.K., Kazunari Ninomiya, C.J. Lewis, Shigeru Matsuzaki and Choi Min-ho. A cover performed by Rie Takahashi was used as an ending theme for the anime Teasing Master Takagi-san season 2, in episodes 3 and 4. Fujin Rizing!, a fictional ska band from multimedia franchise Argonavis from BanG Dream! covered the song and added in the game started on January 14, 2021.

See also
 List of best-selling singles
 List of best-selling singles in Japan

References 

2008 songs
2008 singles
Oricon Weekly number-one singles
Billboard Japan Hot 100 number-one singles
Japanese television drama theme songs
Andrew W.K. songs